AIRCOM International is a telecom network management consultancy firm focusing on end-to-end network planning, sharing, outsourcing, and OSS optimization for IP and cellular networks. The company was founded in May 1995 and is headquartered in Leatherhead near London, with offices in 17 countries.

A privately held company, AIRCOM works with many wireless carriers to upgrade and optimize networks as they migrate from 2G to 3G to 4G to 5G. On 3 December 2013 TEOCO, a telecom software firm based out of Fairfax, Virginia, acquired Aircom International for an undisclosed amount.

Sources
 Alcatel, Ericsson seen as Verizon upgrade vendors
 Skinning the Cat of Mobile Data QoS
 The Power of Going Green
 Will networks get choked?

References 

Telecommunications companies of the United Kingdom